Sarah Cruickshank is a Scottish Gaelic broadcaster from the Isle of Skye who works for BBC Scotland. She is a travel reporter and regularly does the outdoor weather conditions in the evening on BBC Radio Scotland and weather presenter on BBC Alba Gaelic news programme An Là. Cruickshank also presents the weather for BBC Midlands Today and occasionally the national forecast.

She was a regular presenter on the Gaelic children's programme Dè a-nis? from 2003 to  2008, where she interviewed celebrities such as Calum MacDonald of Runrig, Emma Bunton and Girls Aloud.

References

Weather presenters
British reporters and correspondents
Year of birth missing (living people)
Living people